Countach (For Giorgio) is the seventh studio album by Shooter Jennings, released on February 26, 2016 on vinyl through Jennings' own Black Country Rock label. A 16-bit music video for the song "Cat People (Putting Out Fire)" featuring Marilyn Manson was released on August 1.

Composition 
Countach is an album of songs composed or inspired by Italian producer Giorgio Moroder. Jennings has described the album as "a love letter to [his] childhood", explaining that "It all connected. Something that I had just written off as the sound of the Eighties, it was all Giorgio. He's the one that made that wave of music happen. It hit me like a freight train." 

The recording sessions featured guest vocals from Steve Young, Brandi Carlile, Marilyn Manson and Shroud of the Avatar creator Richard Garriott de Cayeux.

The music of Countach has been classified as electronica, country rock, Eurodisco and outlaw country.

Release 
The album was originally scheduled for release in November 2014. However, its release was delayed due to the sudden death of Jon Hensley, Jennings' longtime manager and friend and Black Country Rock co-founder. On February 22, 2016, the album was released digitally inside the multiplayer component of the role-playing video game Shroud of the Avatar: Forsaken Virtues, with players encouraged to search through the game's multiplayer levels to win one of twenty-five free vinyl copies of the album. The album was released on CD, digital download, 8-track tape and vinyl record formats on March 11.

Track listing

Charts

External links

"Cat People (Putting Out Fire)" videoclip on YouTube

References

2016 albums
Albums produced by Shooter Jennings
Electronica albums by American artists
Shooter Jennings albums
Tribute albums